Harold Wilfred Youren (1910–1983) was a New Zealand lawyer, farmer, farmers’ advocate and peace campaigner. He was born in Auckland, New Zealand in 1910.

Biography
Harold attended Wellington College and later read law at Victoria University College and Auckland University College.

References

1910 births
1983 deaths
New Zealand anti-war activists
People from Auckland
New Zealand farmers
20th-century New Zealand lawyers